J. W. Paisley House was a historic home located at Winston-Salem, Forsyth County, North Carolina.  The house was built about 1910–1911, and was a large two-story, three bay, frame dwelling.  The house featured clipped gable roofs and dormers. It was built by John W. Paisley, faculty member of the Slater Industrial Academy for African-American students. The house has been demolished.

It was listed on the National Register of Historic Places in 1979.

References

African-American history in Winston-Salem, North Carolina
Houses on the National Register of Historic Places in North Carolina
Houses completed in 1911
Houses in Winston-Salem, North Carolina
National Register of Historic Places in Winston-Salem, North Carolina